Yoges a/l A. Muniandy (born 13 November 1988) is a Malaysian footballer who plays as a midfielder for Penang in the Malaysia Premier League.

Club career

MISC-MIFA
He help the team to win the 2016 Malaysia FAM Cup with overall scoring 2 goals in the season.

Penang (loan)
In June 2019, Yoges completed his loan deal to Penang.

Honours

Club
MISC-MIFA
 Malaysia FAM League: 2016

Penang FA
 Malaysia Premier League: 2020

References

External links
 

1988 births
Living people
Malaysian footballers
Malaysian people of Indian descent
Association football midfielders
Malaysia Super League players
Malaysia Premier League players
Penang F.C. players
Petaling Jaya City FC players